Dipodium brevilabium is an orchid species that is endemic to Western Papua in Indonesia. The species was formally described in 2009.

References

External links 

brevilabium
Orchids of Indonesia
Plants described in 2009